Statistics of Empress's Cup in the 1987 season.

Overview
It was contested by 16 teams, and Yomiuri SC Beleza won the championship.

Results

1st Round
Shimizudaihachi SC 3-0 Ladies Saijo
Nissan FC 3-0 Hyogo University of Teacher Education
FC Kodaira 7-0 Hiroshima Minami FC
Shimizu FC 0-3 Kobe FC
Takatsuki FC 1-0 Miyagi Hirose Club
Tendai FC 0-0 (pen 2-3) Iga-Ueno Kunoichi SC
Kumamoto Akita 4-0 FC Atletica
Ota Gal 0-5 Yomiuri SC Beleza

Quarterfinals
Shimizudaihachi SC 2-2 (pen 3-2) Nissan FC
FC Kodaira 0-2 Kobe FC
Takatsuki FC 1-0 Iga-Ueno Kunoichi SC
Kumamoto Akita 0-11 Yomiuri SC Beleza

Semifinals
Shimizudaihachi SC 2-1 Kobe FC
Takatsuki FC 0-1 Yomiuri SC Beleza

Final
Shimizudaihachi SC 0-2 Yomiuri SC Beleza
Yomiuri SC Beleza won the championship.

References

Empress's Cup
1987 in Japanese women's football